Yaremis Karelia Fuentes Ramírez (born 30 January 1991) is a Cuban footballer who plays as a midfielder. She has been a member of the Cuba women's national team.

International career
Fuentes capped for Cuba at senior level during the 2012 CONCACAF Women's Olympic Qualifying Tournament (and its qualification) and the 2018 CONCACAF Women's Championship (and its qualification).

References

1991 births
Living people
Cuban women's footballers
Cuba women's international footballers
Women's association football midfielders
21st-century Cuban women